Berry Hollow is a valley in Monongalia County, West Virginia, in the United States.

Berry Hollow has the name of James Berry, a pioneer who settled there.

References

Valleys of West Virginia
Landforms of Monongalia County, West Virginia